Tosham Assembly constituency is one of the 90 Vidhan Sabha (State Assembly) constituencies in Haryana state in northern India.

Overview
Tosham (constituency number 58) is one of the 6 Assembly constituencies located in Bhiwani district. This constituency covers the entire Tosham tehsil and part of Bhiwani tehsil.

Tosham is part of Bhiwani-Mahendragarh Lok Sabha constituency along with eight other Assembly segments, namely, Loharu, Badhra, Dadri and Bhiwani in this district and Ateli, Mahendragarh, Narnaul and Nangal Chaudhry in Mahendragarh district.

Members of Vidhan Sabha

Election results

General elections 2019

See also
 Tosham
 Tosham rock inscription

References

Assembly constituencies of Haryana
Bhiwani district